Richard von Kaufmann (1850–1908) was a German jurist and art collector.

Kaufmann was born in Cologne and became a respected professor and minister of finance. He began to collect art while living in Berlin and donated several works to the new museum began by Wilhelm von Bode. He published a catalog of his collection with help from his friends Bode, Max Friedländer, Friedrich Lippmann and Hugo von Tschudi in 1901.

Kaufmann died in Charlottenburg and most of his collection was sold.

Reference

Jurists from North Rhine-Westphalia
German art collectors
19th-century art collectors
1850 births
1908 deaths
People from Cologne
Academic staff of the Technical University of Berlin